Edgar Luberenga (born April 27, 1979) is a Ugandan former swimmer, who specialized in sprint freestyle events. Luberenga qualified for the men's 50 m freestyle, as Uganda's only swimmer, at the 2004 Summer Olympics in Athens. He received a Universality place from FINA in an entry time of 27.30. He challenged seven other swimmers in heat three, including 16-year-old Chris Hackel of Mauritius. He rounded out the field to last place by six hundredths of a second (0.06) behind Maldives' Hassan Mubah in 27.77. Luberenga failed to advance into the semifinals, as he placed seventy-fifth overall out of 86 swimmers in the preliminaries.

References

1979 births
Living people
Ugandan male freestyle swimmers
Olympic swimmers of Uganda
Swimmers at the 2004 Summer Olympics